Bordei Park is a park in Sector 1  of Bucharest, in the northern part of the city.

The terrain where the Bordei Park stands (which included the Bordei Lake and amounted to 0.13 km²) was bought by the Bucharest Municipality from the Marmorosch Blank Bank in 1932 for a price of 16 million lei ($110,000 at the time). The park was officially opened in 1938 by King Carol II of Romania.

In June 2007, senator Marius Marinescu forwarded to the Standing Bureau of the Senate a legislative proposal concerning the declaration of public property of Costică Constanda's plot of land, located in Bordei Park, Bucharest. Along with the founder of the law Marius Marinescu, signed as co-founders, senators Ion Iliescu, former president of Romania, Nicolae Văcăroiu, former prime-minister of Romania and at the time president of the Senate. One year later the legislative proposal was also adopted by the Chamber of Deputies, received the green light from the president of Romania, and got published in the Official Gazette of Romania, thus becoming Law #170/2008, regarding the acknowledgement of public utility of Bordei Park.

The area of the park was public property until September 2003, when the General Council of Bucharest changed the status of the terrain to private property of the municipality and then gave the terrain to Costică Constanda, an entrepreneur who intends to build houses on it.

References 

Parks in Bucharest